Buena Vista is a city in Paraguay, Caazapá Department; the beginning of this city was the result of the new political division of the country on June 25, 1945.

Etymology
Its name describes the beautiful environment of the place.

Geography
Buena Vista is 266 km away from Asunción.

Weather
Temperatures range from 21 °C to 37 °C in summer, in winter the minimum is 1 °C. ThE city is located in one of the regions with most precipitation, which is the reason why it is the best place for farming and cattle rising.

Demography
There are 5,340 inhabitants, 2,773 are men and 2,567 women, according to the 2002 Census. In the urban area there are 1,416 people and the rural area, 3,924 people.

Economy
The main activity is farming and cattle raising.

Tourism
Wonderful landscapes which refer to the city's name "Buena Vista" (Good View) can be appreciated. Capiibary River is great for fishing.

How to get there
From Asunción, take Route II "Mcal. José Félix Estigarribia" towards east. That route goes to Ciudad del Este.

Bibliography and references

 Geografía Ilustrada del Paraguay, Distribuidora Arami SRL; 2007. 
 Geografía del Paraguay, Primera Edición 1999, Editorial Hispana Paraguay SRL

Populated places in the Caazapá Department